Black Bank railway station was a railway station in Black Bank, Cambridgeshire which is now closed. The station platforms have been demolished but the goods shed still stands and remains in use. Although the station is closed, the line is still in use.

References

External links
 Google streetview of goods shed, as of January 2013

Disused railway stations in Cambridgeshire
Former Great Eastern Railway stations
Railway stations in Great Britain opened in 1847
Railway stations in Great Britain closed in 1963
1847 establishments in England
East Cambridgeshire District